The Texbond Open was a golf tournament on the Challenge Tour that was played from 2004 to 2006 at Gardagolf Country Club, close to the shores of Lake Garda in Soiano del Lago near Brescia, Italy.

Winners

References

External links
Coverage on the Challenge Tour's official site

Former Challenge Tour events
Golf tournaments in Italy